HD 85951 (HR 3923), formally named Felis , is a solitary orange hued star in the constellation Hydra. It has an apparent magnitude of 4.94, making it faintly visible to the naked eye under ideal conditions.

Nomenclature 
HD 85951 was the brightest star in the now-obsolete constellation of Felis. In 2016, the IAU organized a Working Group on Star Names (WGSN) to catalog and standardize proper names for stars. The WGSN approved the name Felis for this star on 1 June 2018 and it is now so included in the List of IAU-approved Star Names.

Properties 
This an evolved red giant with a stellar classification of K5 III. It is currently on the asymptotic giant branch, generating energy via fusion of hydrogen and helium shells around an inert carbon core. Felis has an iron abundance 66% that of the Sun, making it metal deficient.

References

Hydra (constellation)
K-type giants
Durchmusterung objects
085951
048615
3923